Shikargah ( śikārgāh), from Persian shikārgāh meaning shikār hunting + gāh ground, is often described as a hunting ground where 'qamargah' or encircling of game occurs, an overtone of war exercise performed within a controlled arena of flora and fauna to create easier shooting and camping for hunting party.

Mughals evolved it in India from their hunting traditions of Central Asia. On such occasions unresolved matters of courts were settled which included conspiration and preparation for mutinying, raising of invasion forces.

British continued to entertain their dignitaries with tiger hunts at these Shikargah.
  Jim Corbett National Park established in 1932 was first Shikargah among five national parks during British India, by banning hunting through Wild Life (Protection) Act, 1972  India preserved its Shikargahs. Today it boasts 104 national parks, 551 Wildlife Sanctuaries, 131 Marine Protected Areas, 18 Biosphere Reserves, 88 Conservation Reserves and 127 Community Reserves, covering a total of 1,65,088.57 sq km. In total, there are 870 Protected Areas which make 5.06% of the geographical area of the country.

Chronicled Shikargah 
Terrorizing wild beasts were often tamed by Mughals who considered themselves as protectors of people, sources record over seventy shikargahs situated in mountainous forests, deserts, Indo-Gangetic floodplains, rocky outcrops, and coastlands.
 Agra Shikargah, Uttar Pradesh  
 Ajmer Ana Sagar Lake, Nur Chashma Shikargah,  Rajasthan 
 Burhanpur Bagh-i Zaynabad Shikargah, Madhya Pradesh 
 Hissar-i-Firuza Shikargah, Haryana 
 Narwar Shikargah  
 Pakpattan Shikargah Pakistan 
 Mahemdavad Shikargah Ahmedabad, Gujrat  
 Palam, Delhi Shikargah, New Delhi
 Sheikhupura (Jahangirpur/Jahangirabad) Shikargah, Lahore, Pakistan

Neglected Shikargah 
Tral Shikargah At the junction of the Wasturwan Mountain and Kherwon surrounding forests and snow-clad peaks. The Aru spring flows down from the Kolahoi glacier beyond Lidderwat while the Sheshnag from glaciers along the great Himalayas. At the union of the streams flowing from the Jehlum is Shikargah. Located at adjoining villages of Koil, Rathsuna, Buchu, Saimu, Kamla, Haerbuchu, Pinglish, Larbal and Chudu.
 Jaunti Shikargah Close to Rohtak Road, Jaunti is surrounded by  Chatesar on the north, Garhi Rindhala on the south, Ladpur on the east and Kanonda, Khairpur and Mukundpur in Haryana on the western side was established in 1650 by Shahjahan.

Notes

References 

Wildlife conservation
Shikargah